The Raid on Salmon Falls (March 27, 1690) involved Joseph-François Hertel de la Fresnière (and his son Jean-Baptiste Hertel de Rouville), along with Norridgewock Abnaki chief Wahowa, and possibly Maliseet Abnaki war chief Assacumbuit, leading his troops as well as the Wabanaki Confederacy (Mi'kmaq and Maliseet from Fort Meductic) in New Brunswick to capture and destroy an English settlement of Salmon Falls (present-day Berwick, Maine) during King William's War.

Raid 
The village was destroyed, and most of its residents were killed or taken prisoner for transport back to Canada. They killed thirty-four men and carried away captive fifty-four persons, mostly women and children, and plundered and burnt the houses and mills. Militia mustered from Portsmouth and gave chase, but were driven off in a skirmish later that day. Hertel then continued to raid present-day Portland, Maine.

The attackers' original intent was to target the home of Edward Tyng, father of Edward Tyng, at Fort Loyal, but changed plans and attacked Salmon Falls.

See also 
 Military history of the Mi’kmaq Warriors

References

 

Military history of Acadia
Military history of Nova Scotia
Military history of New England
Military history of Canada
Salmon Falls
Salmon Falls
Pre-statehood history of Maine
1690 in North America
Salmon Falls